Nagdah Balain, also known simply as Nagdah, is located in Madhubani District, Bihar in India.

Nagdah is surrounded by four lakes, and is located three kilometers from Kapsiya, and two kilometers from Arer, Madhubani, Bihar. Nagdah's Pin Code is 847222.

Nagdah village contains the Durga Temple. The Durga Puja festival is a festival celebrated in Nagdah village in October and March, during which the "Natak" is played by local boys, at the direction of the senior residents of the village. Vidaya Pati Samroh is another celebration held in Nagdah.

This village is also known by the name of its great son Dr. Subhadra Jha (9 July 1909 - 13 May 2000) . He was a famous linguist cum polyglot(he knew more than 18 languages) and was Sahitya Academy Awardee for Maithili Literature. He was the first D.Litt in Bihar. Later he earned 2nd D.Lit from University of Paris. He was the first foreign invitee to visit Germany after WWII. He wrote several books and stories in different languages. Another famous person of this village is Shri Budhi Nath Jha known for his creation of Om Mahabharath which is first ever epic on Maithili literature.

Geography 

Language and culture 
Maithili is the main language, while Hindi, English and Urdu are also spoken.

Places of interest 

The 3 most popular Durga temples in Madhubani are Raj Rajeshwari Mandir (in Dokhar), Bhagwati Temple (in Nagdah) and Maata Durga Mandir ( in Uchaith).

References

External links 

 Nagdah Blogspot
 Nagdah in WikiEdit

Villages in Madhubani district